Constituency NA-140 (Kasur-III) was a constituency for the National Assembly of Pakistan. It comprised areas in the Kasur Tehsil and Chunian Tehsil which, according to the 2018 delimitations, have now been included in Constituency NA-138 (Kasur-II) and Constituency NA-139 (Kasur-III) respectively.

Election 2002 

General elections were held on 10 Oct 2002. Khurshid Mahmud Kasuri of PML-Q won by 50,318 votes.

Election 2008 

General elections were held on 18 Feb 2008. Sardar Asif Ahmed Ali of PPP won by 41,626 votes.

Election 2013 

General elections were held on 11 May 2013. Rasheed Ahmed Khan of PML-N won by 69,212 votes and became the  member of National Assembly.

References

External links 
 Election result's official website

NA-140